Brigadier-General Sir Percy Molesworth Sykes,  (28 February 1867 – 11 June 1945) was a British soldier, diplomat, and scholar with a considerable literary output. He wrote historical, geographical, and biographical works, as well as describing his travels in Persia and Central Asia.

Early life

Percy Sykes was born in Brompton, Kent, England the only son of Army chaplain Rev. William Sykes (b. 1829) and his wife Mary, daughter of Captain Anthony Oliver Molesworth, of the Royal Artillery, descended from Robert Molesworth, 1st Viscount Molesworth. His sisters Ella Sykes and Ethel Sykes were both writers. His father, William was the second son of Richard Sykes, of Edgeley House, Stockport, owner of the Sykes Bleaching Company; Percy Sykes was thus the nephew of Richard Sykes the rugby player who founded towns in America, and cousin of Sir Alan Sykes, 1st Baronet who was MP for Knutsford, Cheshire.

He was educated at Rugby School and the Royal Military College, Sandhurst.

Military career

Sykes was commissioned into the 16th Lancers, but transferred to the 2nd Dragoon Guards in 1888. He was posted to India and made several journeys through Persia and Baluchistan. When he was a second lieutenant, he was elected a Fellow of the Royal Geographical Society in November 1891. He was sent on a secret mission in November 1892 when he went to Uzbekistan on the Trans-Caspian Railway. Promotion to lieutenant followed on 26 April 1895, and to captain on 8 December 1897. During the Second Boer War he served as second in command of the 9th Battalion, Imperial Yeomanry until September 1901. He later served with the Intelligence Department and was wounded in the leg. He was appointed a Companion of the Order of St Michael and St George (CMG) in the 1902 Coronation Honours list on 26 June 1902 In late 1902 he transferred to the Indian Army, and was Consul at Kerman in Persia. Over the next few years he made extensive journeys in the Middle East and was appointed consul-general for Khūzestān in 1906.

In 1915 Sykes was knighted. In March 1915 he was charged as acting Consul-General in Chinese Turkestan, now Xinjiang, in the Uyghur Autonomous Region of China. Sykes traveled overland from England via Norway to the capital city of Kashgar accompanied by his sister, Ella Constance Sykes, herself a Fellow of the Geographical Society and a well-regarded expert on Persia. The two recorded their journey in series of photographs  and later published Through deserts and oases of Central Asia, a book which documents their nine-month journey.

While stationed in Persia he was given the temporary rank of Brigadier-General, he was placed in command of the South Persia Rifles that he raised himself. His forces, consisting of some 7,000 men, supported the Russians at Isfahan against Bakhtiaras and restored some order to the country.  Once stationed at Isfahan, Sykes used numerous excuses to remain, including a supposed Russian request that the South Persia rifles be used as a garrison for Isfahan. By 1917 numerous British authorities were calling for his removal save Lord Curzon.  Despite this, Sykes was finally recalled in 1918.

Later life
Sykes retired from the army in 1924, retaining the honorary rank of Brigadier-General.  From 1932 until his death he was honorary secretary of the Royal Central Asian Society, now known as the Royal Society for Asian Affairs.  The society has in its gift an award called The Sir Percy Sykes Memorial Medal.

The Royal Geographical Society awarded him the Back grant in 1899 and the Patron's Medal in 1902.

Family and legacy
In 1902 he married Evelyn Seton, eldest daughter of Colonel Bruce Seton of the Royal Engineers and they had six children. His daughter Rachel married Sir Patrick Reilly the diplomat.

Percy's family later introduced the "Sykes medal", awarded to those who contributed to the understanding of Persia and Central Asia.

Publications

Notes

References
 Who’s Who

External links
 SYKES, Sir Percy Molesworth, Encyclopædia Iranica
Royal society for Asian Affairs
A report on the mission of Percy Sykes in Kashghar in 1915, and his photos from there
 
 

English explorers
1945 deaths
1867 births
Military personnel from Kent
16th The Queen's Lancers officers
2nd Dragoon Guards (Queen's Bays) officers
British Army personnel of the Second Boer War
British Indian Army generals
Male non-fiction writers
English travel writers
Fellows of the Royal Geographical Society
Graduates of the Royal Military College, Sandhurst
Indian Army personnel of World War I
People educated at Rugby School
Knights Commander of the Order of the Indian Empire
Companions of the Order of the Bath
Companions of the Order of St Michael and St George